Zielonki may refer to the following places:
Zielonki, Lesser Poland Voivodeship (south Poland)
Zielonki, Busko County in Świętokrzyskie Voivodeship (south-central Poland)
Zielonki, Jędrzejów County in Świętokrzyskie Voivodeship (south-central Poland)
Zielonki, Masovian Voivodeship (east-central Poland)
Zielonki, Pomeranian Voivodeship (north Poland)